Live! Action is a live album by saxophonist Willis Jackson which was recorded in New York City in 1964 and released on the Prestige label in 1966. Three additional albums were released from the same performance Jackson's Action!, Tell It..., and Soul Night/Live!.

Reception

Allmusic awarded the album 3 stars.

Track listing 
All compositions by Willis Jackson except as indicated
 "Hello Dolly!" (Jerry Herman) - 2:25   
 "Annie Laurie" - 2:28   
 "Blowin' Like Hell" - 5:55   
 "Blue Gator" - 3:45   
 "I'm A Fool to Want You" (Joel Herron, Frank Sinatra, Jack Wolf) - 3:26   
 "Gator Tail" - 9:55   
 "Satin Doll" (Duke Ellington, Billy Strayhorn, Johnny Mercer) - 9:52  
Recorded at The Allegro in New York City on March 21, 1964

Personnel 
Willis Jackson - tenor saxophone
Frank Robinson - trumpet
Carl Wilson - organ
Pat Martino - guitar
Joe Hadrick  - drums

References 

Willis Jackson (saxophonist) live albums
1966 live albums
Prestige Records live albums